Peter W. Douris (born February 19, 1966) is a Canadian former professional ice hockey right winger who played in the National Hockey League from 1985 to 1998.

Biography
Douris was born in Toronto, Ontario. As a youth, he played in the 1979 Quebec International Pee-Wee Hockey Tournament with a minor ice hockey team from Don Mills.

He was drafted in the second round, 30th overall by the Winnipeg Jets in the 1984 NHL Entry Draft after his freshman season at the University of New Hampshire. He left college hockey after his sophomore year to join the Canadian National Team in 1985-86.

In Douris's first season he only played 11 games and did not acquire any points. In his second season, he showed impressive actions in the American Hockey League for the Sherbrooke Canadiens by notching 14 goals and 28 assists for 42 points in 62 games. But in the Jets he was only dressed in 6 games.

After spending 3 seasons with the Jets he was traded to the St. Louis Blues for defenseman Kent Carlson and a fourth round draft pick. Peter spent the season playing for the Blues International Hockey League affiliate Peoria Rivermen. Douris signed with Boston Bruins for the 1989-90 season as an unrestricted free agent. In his first season in Boston colours, he played 36 games and notched 5 goals and 6 assists along with 15 penalty minutes.

In the 1992 playoffs with the Bruins, Douris scored the game-winner in Game Two at the Forum against Montreal en route to a four-game series sweep. It was the first time Boston had won an overtime playoff game at the Forum since 1943. "That was definitely a huge thrill," Douris says years later. "I remember coming off the ice, [and the scratches were] waiting by the dressing room... The look on their faces were like, 'Holy smokes!... You just got an overtime goal at the Forum. You were just eating hotdogs in the stands with us [in the last game]!"

After spending three seasons with Boston, the Mighty Ducks of Anaheim acquired him as a free agent for their inaugural season in 1993. He was at the Mighty Ducks for three seasons before moving to the Dallas Stars in 1998 where he only play just one game and that was his last season with the NHL.

Douris then headed to Germany's Deutsche Eishockey Liga where he spent four seasons, one with Landshut EV and three with the Munich Barons after relocating from Landshut. Douris retired in 2002, in 11 NHL seasons he scored 54 goals and 67 assists for 121 points in 321 games, picking up 80 penalty minutes. Douris spent the 2013-2014 season as head coach of Vojens IK. He is now retired from hockey and lives in Maine where he works in real estate.

Douris' niece, Raina Douris is the host of NPR's World Cafe.

Career statistics

Regular season and playoffs

International

References

External links

1966 births
Boston Bruins players
Canadian expatriate ice hockey players in Germany
Canadian ice hockey right wingers
Dallas Stars players
EV Landshut players
Kalamazoo Wings (1974–2000) players
Living people
Maine Mariners players
Mighty Ducks of Anaheim players
Milwaukee Admirals (IHL) players
Moncton Hawks players
München Barons players
New Hampshire Wildcats men's ice hockey players
Peoria Rivermen (IHL) players
Providence Bruins players
Sherbrooke Canadiens players
Ice hockey people from Toronto
Winnipeg Jets (1979–1996) draft picks
Winnipeg Jets (1979–1996) players